Kundashly (Köndäşle) is a rural locality (a village) and the administrative centre of Kundashlinsky Selsoviet, Baltachevsky District, Bashkortostan, Russia. The population was 597 as of 2010. There are 12 streets.

Geography 
Kundashly is located 30 km southeast of Starobaltachevo (the district's administrative centre) by road. Chukaly is the nearest rural locality.

References 

Rural localities in Baltachevsky District